The 1944 South Sydney was the 37th in the club's history. The club competed in the New South Wales Rugby Football League Premiership (NSWRFL), finishing the season 4th, losing the semifinals 15-6 to Balmain.

Ladder

Fixtures

Finals

References

South Sydney Rabbitohs seasons
1944 in Australian rugby league